Dreamboat is a 1952 American comedy film directed by Claude Binyon and starring Clifton Webb, Ginger Rogers, Anne Francis and Jeffrey Hunter.

Plot

The respectable lives of English literature lecturer Thornton Sayre and his daughter Carol are disrupted when it is revealed that Thornton was once the matinee idol Bruce Blair, who played El Toro (based on Zorro) and other romantic figures, and was widely known as the "Dreamboat". His films are now being broadcast on a television show hosted by his former costar Gloria Marlowe.

Thornton's daughter Carol is belittled by fellow students following the revelation. Her father affirms that he was a teacher before he was an actor.

The college administration committee ask for his resignation, but president Mathilda May Coffey requests power to decide how to proceed. In private, she admits to Thornton that she had been one of his biggest fans, and attempts unsuccessfully to seduce him.

Thornton and Carol hastily leave for New York to seek an injunction against the show. There they meet Sam Levitt, the man responsible for airing the movies. While Sam and Gloria try to convince Thornton to change his mind, Sam has underling Bill Ainslee show Carol the city.

Thornton eventually procures his injunction, but he is fired after spurning Coffey's advances. Meanwhile, Bill and Carol have fallen in love and are planning to marry.

When Gloria gloats over Thornton's setbacks, he reveals that a major movie studio is interested in reviving his film career. Months later, Bill and Carol attend Thornton's premiere in Sitting Pretty - a real film starring Clifton Webb. Gloria then reveals to Thornton that she has bought his contract and is now his boss.

Cast

Music
The film features the 1920 standard Al Jolson hit "Avalon", written by Jolson, Buddy DeSylva and Vincent Rose, and includes Ginger Rogers singing "You'll Never Know", a 1943 song written by Harry Warren and Mack Gordon.

Reception 
In a contemporary review for The New York Times, critic Bosley Crowther wrote: "Hollywood's low opinion of TV is once more revealed with blithely superior derision and a lordly splurge of burlesque ... [T]he fastest and most hilarious sport in the film is that generated in the travesties of old silent movies that are shown. ... These are the most inventive and satiric bits in the film." Crowther praised "the serene and eloquent Clifton Webb" as "deliciously consistent when dishing out cutting remarks or betraying the slightest traces of middle-aged vanity[.]"

References

External links

 
 
 
 

1952 films
1952 comedy films
20th Century Fox films
American comedy films
American black-and-white films
Films about actors
Films directed by Claude Binyon
Films scored by Cyril J. Mockridge
Films set in New York City
Films produced by Sol C. Siegel
1950s English-language films
1950s American films